Budigere  is a small town in the southern state of Karnataka, India. It is located in the Devanahalli taluk of Bangalore Rural district.

Demographics
 India census, Budigere had a population of 5063+ with 2606+ males and 2457+ females.

See also
 Bangalore Rural
 Districts of Karnataka

References

External links
 http://Bangalorerural.nic.in/

Villages in Bangalore Rural district